Rodolfo Mills Palmer (born 25 May 1958 in Limón) is a retired Costa Rican football player.

Club career
A tough-tackling defender, Mills made his professional debut for Limonense on 6 April 1975 against Alajuelense. He later played for Liga over two periods and had a stint abroad with Honduran side F.C. Motagua. He also played for Herediano and Saprissa. He retired in September 1990.

International career
Mills was capped by Costa Rica, playing 17 games and scoring 3 goals. He represented his country in 9 FIFA World Cup qualification matches.

His final international was a September 1985 FIFA World Cup qualification match against Honduras.

References

1958 births
Living people
People from Limón Province
Association football defenders
Costa Rican footballers
Costa Rica international footballers
L.D. Alajuelense footballers
F.C. Motagua players
C.S. Herediano footballers
Deportivo Saprissa players
Costa Rican expatriate footballers
Expatriate footballers in Honduras
Liga FPD players